Shuyuan is a station on Line 16 of the Shanghai Metro in Pudong, Shanghai.

The station has 3 tracks, one island platform, and one side platform. The inner island platform is not in service. Trains heading to Longyang Road use the outer island platform, whilst trains towards Dishui Lake use the side platform. This station utilizes the same platform layout as one of its neighbouring stations, Lingang Avenue, on the same line. Express trains heading to Longyang Road usually pass through the inner island platform.

References

Railway stations in Shanghai
Line 16, Shanghai Metro
Shanghai Metro stations in Pudong
Railway stations in China opened in 2013